Pelagosaurus (meaning "lizard of the open sea") is an extinct genus of thalattosuchian crocodyliform that lived during the Toarcian stage of the Lower Jurassic, around 183 Ma to 176 Ma (million years ago), in shallow epicontinental seas that covered much of what is now Western Europe. The systematic taxonomy of Pelagosaurus has been fiercely disputed over the years, and was assigned to Thalattosuchia after its systematics within Teleosauridae were disputed.

Discovery
 
Pelagosaurus was originally described from a specimen from Normandy, but the holotype for P. typus was discovered north of the town of Ilminster in Somerset, England. Most Pelagosaurus remains have been found in the Ilminster area, but numerous other remains, predominantly skulls and articulated skeletons, have been found around Western Europe in locations such as France, Germany, and Switzerland. Specimens from the Somerset region come primarily from the Strawberry Bank quarry north of Ilminster; although the site had yielded other fossil remains before, the site has since been built over. One of the specimens was that of a small juvenile, providing some insight into Pelagosaurus' growth pattern.

Evolutionary relationships
The evolutionary relationships of Pelagosaurus have historically been contentious as there have been several different interpretations of its placement in Thalattosuchia.

Pelagosaurus was initially classified as a teleosaurid, based upon anatomical similarity, by Eudes-Deslongchamps, Westphal and Duffin. Its position as a basal metriorhynchid was suggested by Eric Buffetaut in 1980., Phylogenetic analyses from the 1980s, 1990s and early 2000s found Pelagosaurus to be the sister taxon to both Teleosauridae and Metriorhynchidae. Some later phylogenetic analyses in the 2000s found Pelagosaurus to be a basal teleosaurid, while other subsequent studies from the late 2010s and early 2020s have found it to be a basal metriorhynchoid.

Palaeobiology
 
Pelagosaurus was well adapted to aquatic life; it had developed a long, streamlined snout, a tail with fin-like attributes and paddle-like limbs for swimming in the warm, shallow waters of its time. Pelagosaurus had 30 teeth suitable for hunting and grasping fish, crustaceans and insects whilst swimming; indeed, one fossil specimen was found with a Leptolepis— an early teleost fish— in its stomach contents. Its forward-facing eyes and streamlined body suggest that Pelagosaurus was a pursuit predator, rather than a scavenger or ambush hunter. Pelagosaurus was markedly similar to modern crocodiles, and would have swum in much similar manner, whipping its tail from side to side, although its veterbral structure was slightly more agile, probably allowing for more movement in the water than its modern equivalents. Pelagosaurus would have only emerged from the water to lay eggs or to rest on the banks, and would have spent the rest of its day in the water for which it was adapted.

Comparisons with other crocodilians shows it was a small prey specialist, less suited to tackle large prey than even modern gharials.

See also

List of marine reptiles

References

Prehistoric life of Europe
Prehistoric pseudosuchian genera
Prehistoric marine crocodylomorphs
Early Jurassic crocodylomorphs
Jurassic reptiles of Europe
Thalattosuchians